Johann Baptist von Lampi the Younger (4 March 1775 – 17 February 1837) was an Austrian portrait painter.

Biography
He was born to the portrait painter, Johann Baptist von Lampi, now known as "The Elder", and his wife, Anna Maria née Franchi (1745-1795). After receiving his first lessons from his father, he followed him to Vienna in 1786, where he enrolled at the Academy of Fine Arts. His primary instructors there were Hubert Maurer and Heinrich Friedrich Füger.

Upon completing his studies, in 1791, he accompanied his father and his younger brother, Franz Xaver (who was also a painter), to Saint Petersburg; enticed by an extremely generous offer from Catherine the Great. He would stay there for thirteen years. In 1795, his work earned him the honorary title of "Free Artist" from the Imperial Academy of Arts. Two years later, praise for his portrait of Professor Ivan Akimov led to his being named an "Academician".

He returned to Vienna with his wife and daughter in 1804, to accept a position at the court of Francis I, who had declared himself Emperor of Austria. In 1813, he was named a Professor and became a member of the Council of the Academy of Arts. He took over his father's workshop in 1822. He was primarily a portrait painter, but also created genre scenes and religious works.

His works may be seen at the Belvedere Gallery, the Vienna Museum, the Salzburg Museum, and the Tretyakov Gallery. His eldest son, Johann Baptist Matthias (1807–1857), was also a painter of some note.

Selected portraits

Sources

External links

1775 births
1837 deaths
18th-century Austrian painters
18th-century Austrian male artists
Austrian male painters
19th-century Austrian painters
19th-century Austrian male artists
18th-century Italian painters
Italian male painters
19th-century Italian painters
Italian nobility
Austrian nobility
Austrian people of Italian descent
People from Trento
19th-century Italian male artists
18th-century Italian male artists